Paul Sidney Wingard (1930 – June 11, 2014) was an American politician and member of the Ohio House of Representatives.

References

1930 births
2014 deaths
Republican Party members of the Ohio House of Representatives